Gruenenfelder is a rare last name that originated from the village Grünenfeld in the Kanton of St Gallen in the east of Switzerland. Though the vast majority of people with the name reside in Germany or Switzerland, there are some members of the Gruenenfelder family that live in other countries, primarily in the United States. According to family legend the family were originally Freiherren Arth von Grünenfeld and later assumed the surname Grünenfelder.

People with the "Gruenenfelder" surname 
 Alex Gruenenfelder, American activist
 Andi Grünenfelder, Swiss cross-country skier
 Boniface Gruenenfelder, Swiss-born American professor of music, composer and band conductor; inducted 1989 into the Minnesota Music Hall of Fame
 Corina Grünenfelder, Swiss former alpine skier who competed in the 2002 Winter Olympics
 Jürg Grünenfelder, Swiss alpine skier
 Kim Gruenenfelder, American author
 Robert Gruenenfelder, American jazz musician of radio and television and grandson of Boniface (above); inducted 1990 into the Minnesota Music Hall of Fame
 Tobias Grünenfelder, Swiss alpine skier